Ilex inundata is a species of tree in the family Aquifoliaceae. It is native to South America.

References

Trees of Colombia
Trees of Ecuador
Trees of Peru
Trees of Brazil
Trees of Bolivia
inundata